Dobri Dyal is a village in Northern Bulgaria. The village is located in Lyaskovets Municipality, Veliko Tarnovo Province. Аccording to the numbers provided by the 2020 Bulgarian census, Dobri Dyal currently has a population of 1101 people with a permanent address registration in the settlement.

Geography and Culture 
Dobri Dyal village is located in Northern Bulgaria

The elevation in the village varies between 100 and 199 meters with an average of 121 meters.

The first mentions of the village date back to Thracian times. There is a Byzantine stronghold near the village which was built in the 5th century. Its name is the “Mihneva Mogila”

The village's festival is held yearly on the date of 15 August. It is also called the potato festival and is organized by the local pension club.

Buildings 

 There is an acting city hall and library since 1903.
 Elementary school “Ivan Vazov”

Ethnicity 
According to the Bulgarian population census in 2011.

References 

Villages in Veliko Tarnovo Province